Neltenexine (trade name Alveoten) is a mucolytic.

References 

Antitussives
Thiophenes
Bromoarenes
Acetanilides
Secondary alcohols
Carboxamides